Cultösaurus Erectus is the seventh studio album by American hard rock band Blue Öyster Cult, released on June 14, 1980. Following an experiment with a more-polished sound on the album Mirrors (released the previous year), this recording marked a return to the band's earlier, heavier sound. It also represents the band's first collaboration with British producer Martin Birch (Deep Purple, Fleetwood Mac, Black Sabbath, Iron Maiden), who would also produce the band's following album Fire of Unknown Origin a year later.

While the album did sell more than its predecessor, it stalled at Gold status. However, during this time Blue Öyster Cult was still filling large venues. The tour promoting Cultösaurus Erectus found the band co-headlining sports arenas in the United States with Black Sabbath as part of the Black and Blue Tour.

The album cover features the central part of the painting Behemoth's World by British artist Richard Clifton-Dey.

Songs
"Black Blade" features lyrics by fantasy and sci-fi writer Michael Moorcock and is about Stormbringer, a black sword wielded by Elric of Melniboné, the most famous character in Moorcock's mythology.

The title "The Marshall Plan" is a play on words, connecting the post-World War II economic program with the British amplifier manufacturer.

Track listing

Personnel
Band members
Eric Bloom – guitar, keyboards, vocals
Donald "Buck Dharma" Roeser – lead guitar, bass (on "Deadline"), keyboards, vocals
Allen Lanier – keyboards, guitar
Joe Bouchard – bass, vocals
Albert Bouchard – drums, vocals

Additional musicians
Don Kirshner – introduction for "The Marshall Plan"
Mark Rivera – saxophone on "Monsters"

Production
Martin Birch – producer, engineer, mixing
Clay Hutchinson – second engineer
Richard Clifton-Dey – front cover art
Paula Scher – cover design

Charts

References

Blue Öyster Cult albums
1980 albums
Albums produced by Martin Birch
Columbia Records albums
Songs with lyrics by Michael Moorcock